Leslie Richard Marks (14 December 1892 – 28 August 1919) was an Australian rules footballer who played with University in the Victorian Football League.

He served twice during World War I, firstly with the 6th Field Ambulance unit, before returning to Australia in 1916. He then re-enlisted with the 8th Field Artillery Brigade unit in November 1917.  He died soon after returning to Australia in 1919 when he was a passenger in a car that crashed in Bendigo, killing Marks and two other passengers.

Sources

 Holmesby, Russell & Main, Jim (2007). The Encyclopedia of AFL Footballers. 7th ed. Melbourne: Bas Publishing.

External links

World War I service record

1892 births
1919 deaths
University Football Club players
Australian military personnel of World War I
Australian rules footballers from Bendigo
Road incident deaths in Victoria (Australia)